Dave Schmelzer (born August 16, 1962) is an American author, playwright, and former pastor in the Association of Vineyard Churches.  He is best known for his non-fiction book, Not The Religious Type, Confessions of a Turncoat Atheist, which details his movement away from atheism and towards the Christian faith, and for founding the Blue Ocean Summit, which gathers ministers and lay leaders interested in addressing matters of faith to a secular world.

Biography
At 18, Schmelzer entered Stanford University as a devout atheist.  His conversion experience, chronicled in Not the Religious Type, led to a growing involvement with his on-campus ministry and ongoing confusion; without a religious background, Schmelzer had to reconcile his secular upbringing with matters of faith.  This interest with addressing God to a secular and Western audience has been a fundamental theme of his pastoral and authorial work. (See Published Works below)

In the late 1990s, Schmelzer and his wife, Grace, moved to Boston to help found the Vineyard Christian Fellowship of Cambridge Massachusetts, since renamed Reservoir Church.  At the time, Cambridge (and the Boston area) had a less than 2% of church attendees on any given Sunday.  During his tenure, the Boston Vineyard peaked at over 1,000 visitors and seeding several church plants, including The River NYC. Since leaving the Boston Vineyard in 2013, Schmelzer transitioned full-time to Blue Ocean Faith, the nonprofit spawned from the Blue Ocean Summit.

Schmezler holds a degree in literature from Stanford University and later received his M.A. in theology from Fuller Theological Seminary.  He maintains the Blue Ocean Faith site, which mixes faith and secular thinking, along with other guest bloggers.

Published works
 SEEK, 2010, Not Religious Inc.
 Blue Ocean Handbook, 2009, Not Religious Inc.
 Confessions of a Turncoat Atheist, 2008, SaltRiver
 Danny Comes Home, 2004, Crawlspace Press

External links
 Blue Ocean Faith site 
 Amazon.com author page
 Intro chapter to Not the Religious Type

References

1962 births
Living people
American Christian writers
Stanford University alumni
Fuller Theological Seminary alumni
20th-century American dramatists and playwrights
American bloggers
Writers from Boston
20th-century American non-fiction writers
21st-century American non-fiction writers